Kibosh is the main antagonist in the franchise Casper the Friendly Ghost. Kibosh is the powerful, evil and feared King of Ghosts. He is a big and muscular green ghost with red eyes. He is the archenemy of Casper, and he has great contempt for the little ghost and his uncles although he is less villainous in Casper's Scare School than in his earlier appearances, though he still has contempt for Casper and his uncles in the latter appearance.

History

Films and Television

Casper: A Spirited Beginning 
Kibosh's debut appearance is in Casper: A Spirited Beginning. After discovering Casper's absent in the Ghost Central, he becomes furious about the idea of letting a rookie ghost being let loose without any education and forces his spineless assistant Snivel to find Casper and bring him back. Time after, Kibosh arrives in Deedstown, captures the Trio, and forces Snivel to find Casper, who is in Applegate Mansion trying to defuse a bomb. When they enter the mansion, Casper eats the bomb, which explodes in his stomach, saving the mansion in the process. Kibosh is impressed with Casper's technique, and Casper informs him that the Ghostly Trio taught him how to do it, so Kibosh decides to let the Trio stay and haunt Applegate Mansion as a reward for their "teachings". The Trio return Casper the favor by lying to Kibosh saying that they are Casper's uncles, and Kibosh allows them to stay as a "family" before leaving the mansion and returning to the Spirit World. For most part Kibosh could not pronounce Casper's name properly (calling the young ghost Carter, Chrysler, Kanker, etc.) until Snivel is the one who mispronounces.

Casper's Haunted Christmas 
In Casper's Haunted Christmas, Kibosh decrees that Casper must scare someone before Christmas Day, or else he and his uncles will be banished to The Dark for all eternity. He even confiscates the Ghostly Trio's haunting licenses, saying he will return them once Casper succeeds in this task. He then sends Casper and the Trio to the Christmas-themed town of Kriss, Massachusetts, to find at least one person there they can truly scare before Christmas Day. Toward the film's climax, Casper succeeds in scaring the Ghostly Trio (as Kibosh never stated the person he scares had to be a living person), by creating a replica of Kibosh, thus saving both them and himself from getting sent to The Dark. The Trio return Casper the favor by deliberately torturing themselves in front of Kibosh, as their Christmas present to him. In return for a long hard laugh from watching and enjoying their pain, Kibosh restores their haunting licenses as his Christmas present to them. He then bids them all Merry Christmas and returns to the Spirit World in holiday cheer.

Casper's Scare School 
In the film Casper's Scare School, Kibosh has Casper enrolled into a Scare School. It is revealed that the reason he is so tough on Casper is because he used to be just like him when he was his age. He is also a character in the TV series.

Video Games

Casper: Friends Around the World
In Casper: Friends Around the World, Kibosh is disgusted by Casper playing with his new child friends outside Whipstaff Manor, thinking he is too chummy with "fleshies" and decides to isolate them all as punishment. He uses a machine to transport each child to their respective home country, and brainwashes the Ghostly Trio into serving him, each one guarding a piece to the device that will send them all back to Whipstaff. Casper treks the globe searching for the children in their home countries, finding map pieces of the next country to visit, and freeing his uncles from Kibosh's hypnosis. Eventually, Casper saves both the Trio and the children and receives all three parts for the Return-Home device. If he collects every friendship crystal in the game, he refuses to return to Whipstaff Manor until he teaches Kibosh a lesson. He tracks him down to Atlantis where they engage in combat, with Casper being the victor. He offers Kibosh a choice to be friendly and turn his life around, which Kibosh turns down and claims that it is not over between them. Kibosh retreats to the Spirit World while Casper, the Ghostly Trio, and the children are all transported back to Whipstaff Manor. If Casper fails to collect every friendship crystal, he returns straight to Whipstaff Manor but he wonders where Kibosh is hiding.

Casper: Spirit Dimensions
Kibosh is at his most villainous in Casper: Spirit Dimensions. He overthrows the Guardian of Light and becomes the Spirit World's new emperor, and then plans to add the Mortal World to his Undead Empire. Wendy the Good Little Witch calls Casper over to help her defy him, but Kibosh does not think that Casper would be of a threat to him and just leaves him without fighting him, thinking he would never free all four dimensions that make up the Spirit World from his rule. However, once Casper frees three out the four dimensions, Kibosh gets furious and desperate, and decides to kidnap Wendy and take her with him to the Guardian of Light's castle in the fourth and final Spirit Dimension. With the help of Wendy's friend Vanessa, Casper hijacks a ghost pirate ship owned by Captain Pegleg Potbelly, and uses it to get to the castle. Once there, he frees the Guardian of Light, who unlocks the door to her throne room where Kibosh and Wendy are waiting for him. The two ghosts engage in combat, with Casper almost achieving victory, until Kibosh absorbs all the castle's energy and becomes the biggest, strongest, and deadliest ghost in existence. Casper still defeats him regardless and saves Wendy, and the Guardian of Light banishes Kibosh to The Dark with no chance of return. Undeterred, Kibosh vows never to underestimate Casper again, and begins planning his escape from The Dark.

References

External links 
 Kibosh on IMDb

Fictional ghosts
Fictional kings
Film characters introduced in 1997
Casper characters
Animated characters
Male characters in film